"Little Thoughts"/"Tulips" are two songs by English rock band Bloc Party. They were released together as a double A-side single on 12 July 2004 from the band's second extended play, Little Thoughts. The track "Little Thoughts" later appeared on certain versions and re-releases of the band's debut studio album, Silent Alarm. "Tulips" was later released as a standalone single on 25 January 2005 in the US only. The single peaked at number 38 on the UK Singles Chart and number 53 on the Swedish Singles Chart.

Track listing

CD
 Wichita / WEBB067SCD
"Little Thoughts"
"Tulips"
"Banquet (Phones Disco Edit)"

7" vinyl
 Wichita / WEBB067S (limited edition blue vinyl)
"Little Thoughts"
"Storm and Stress"

Charts

References

2004 singles
Bloc Party songs
Wichita Recordings singles
2004 songs
Song recordings produced by Paul Epworth